Roald Charlesovich Mandelstam (September 16, 1932, Leningrad - February 26, 1961, Leningrad) was a Russian poet.

Biography 
Born in Leningrad, September 16, 1932.

He studied at the Polytechnic Institute, then at the Faculty of Oriental Studies Saint Petersburg State University. He did not finish his education; because of the severe form of tuberculosis he could not work anywhere else and almost never left the house.

In 1954 he married the poet Nina Markevich (1931-1992).

Repeatedly he tried to publish his poems, but had his lifetime publications.

In the late 1950s he experienced persistent acute illness, repeatedly lying in the hospital.

On January 26, 1961 he died in the hospital from a hemorrhage and was buried in the Krasnenkoye Cemetery in Leningrad.

Bibliography

References

External links
 Выставка Г.А.В. Траугот – Роальд Мандельштам 
 Поэзия Роальда Мандельштама

1932 births
1961 deaths
Russian-language poets
Soviet male poets
20th-century Russian male writers
20th-century deaths from tuberculosis
Tuberculosis deaths in the Soviet Union
Tuberculosis deaths in Russia